This is a list of schools in Nanshan District, Shenzhen.

Shenzhen municipal schools
Schools in Nanshan District under the municipal government include:
Shenzhen Experimental School - Nanshan District campuses include:
Full boarding high school department
 (深圳大学师范学院附属中学) - Affiliated with Shenzhen University
 (深圳市第二高级中学) - Xili

Nanshan district schools

Secondary schools
Secondary schools governed by Futian District include:
  - Affiliated with Beijing Normal University
 Shenzhen Bolun Vocational and Technical School
 Shenzhen Nanshan Experimental Education Group
 Nanhai Middle School (南海中学)
 Qilin Middle School (麒麟中学)
 Shenzhen Nanshan Foreign Language School (Group)
 Binhai Middle School (滨海中学)
 Gaoxin Middle School (高新中学)
 Taoyuan Middle School (桃源中学)
 High School (高级中学)
 Second Foreign Language School of Nanshan (Group) 
 Xuefu Middle School (学府中学)
 Shenzhen Shekou Yucai Education Group
 Yucai High School 
 
 Yucai No.3 Middle School 
 Shenzhen Nanshan OCT High School
 OCT Campus (侨城初中部)
 Shenwan Campus (深圳湾部)

Nine-year schools
Nine-year schools include:
 Shenzhen Nanshan Taiziwan School (深圳市南山区太子湾学校)
 Shenzhen Nanshan Lixiang School (深圳市南山区荔香学校)
 Shenzhen Nanshan Shekou School (深圳市南山区蛇口学校)
 Shenzhen Nanshan Experimental Education Group
 Qianhai Gangwan School (前海港湾学校)
 Yuanding School (园丁学校)
 Shenzhen Nanshan Foreign Language School (Group)
 Dachong School (大冲学校)
 Kehua School (科华学校)
 Wenhua School (文华学校)
 Shenzhen Nanshan Songping School (深圳市南山区松坪学校)
 Shenzhen Nanshan Qianhai School (深圳市南山区前海学校)
 Shenzhen Nanshan Second Experimental School  (深圳市南山区第二实验学校)
 Shenzhen Nanshan Tongle School (同乐学校)
 Shenzhen Nanshan Second Foreign Languages School (Group)  (深圳市南山区第二外国语学校（集团）)
 Haide School (海德学校)
 Nanshan Shekou Yucai Education Group (深圳市南山区蛇口育才教育集团)
 Longzhu School (龙珠学校)
 Shenzhen Nanshan Chiwan School (深圳市南山区赤湾学校)
 Experimental School of Harbin Institute of Technology in Nanshan, Shenzhen (深圳市南山区哈工大（深圳）实验学校)
 Shenzhen University Town Lihu Experimental School (深圳市南山区深圳大学城丽湖实验学校)
 Shenzhen Nanshan Wenli Experimental School (Group) (深圳市南山区文理实验学校（集团）)
 Kechuang School (科创学校)
 Wenli Experimental School (文理实验学校)
 Shenzhen Nanshan Shenzhen Bay School (深圳市南山区深圳湾学校)
 The Experimental School of Shenzhen Institute of Advanced Technology (深圳市南山区中国科学院深圳先进技术研究院实验学校 
 Shenzhen Middle School Nanshan Innovation School (深圳市深中南山创新学校)
 Longyuan School (龙苑学校)

Primary schools

District primary schools include:
 Shenzhen Nanshan Experimental Education Group
 Dingtai Primary School (鼎太小学)
 Lilin Primary School (荔林小学)
 Liwan Primary School (荔湾小学)
 Nantou Primary School (南头小学)
 Qilin Primary School (麒麟小学)
 Shenzhen Shekou Yucai Education Group
 Yucai No.1 Primary School (育才一小)
 Yucai No.2 Primary School (育才二小)
 Yucai No.3 Primary School (育才三小)
 Yucai No.4 Primary School (育才四小)
 Primary School of Nanshan School Attached to Beijing Normal University (北京师范大学南山附属学校小学部)
 Shenzhen Nanshan Qianhai Gangwan Primary School (深圳市南山区前海港湾小学)
 Shenzhen Nanshan Foreign Language School (Group)
 Binhai Primary School (滨海小学)
 Keyuan Primary School (科苑小学)
 Shenzhen Nanshan Second Foreign Language School (Group) (深圳市南山区第二外国语学校（集团）)
 Dakan Primary School (大磡小学)
 Hai'an Primary School (海岸小学)
 Pingshan Primary School (平山小学)
 Xuefu No.1 Primary School (学府一小)
 Xuefu No.2 Primary School (学府二小)
 Shenzhen Nanshan Wenli Experimental School Group (深圳市南山区文理实验学校（集团）)
 No.1 Primary School (文理一小)
 No.2 Primary School (文理二小)
 Shenzhen OCT Primary School (深圳市南山区华侨城小学)
 Shenzhen Nanshan Nanyou Primary School (深圳市南山区南油小学)
 Shenzhen Nanhai Primary School (深圳市南山区南海小学)
 Shenzhen University Town Xili Experimental Primary School (深圳市南山区大学城西丽实验小学)
 Shenzhen Nanshan Primary School (深圳市南山区南山小学)
 Shenzhen Xiangnan Primary School (深圳市南山区向南小学)
 Shenzhen Haibin Experimental Primary School (深圳市南山区海滨实验小学)
 Shenzhen Bay Campus (深圳湾部)
 Yukang Campus (愉康部)
 Shenzhen Nanshan Zhuguang Primary School (深圳市南山区珠光小学)
 Nanshan Songping Second Primary School (深圳市南山区松坪第二小学)
 Shenzhen Nantou Cheng Primary School (深圳市南山区南头城小学)
 Shenzhen Nanshan Daxin Primary School (深圳市南山区大新小学)
 Shenzhen Qianhai Primary School (深圳市南山区前海小学)
 Shenzhen Nanshan Experimental Education Group (深圳市南山区南山实验教育集团) Baimang Primary School (白芒小学)
 Shenzhen University Normal College Affiliated Houhai Primary School (深圳市南山区深圳大学师范学院附属后海小学  	广东省深圳市南山区后海大道2142号
 Shenzhen Nanshan Shahe Primary School (深圳市南山区沙河小学)
 Shenzhen Nanshan Taoyuan Primary School (深圳市南山区桃源小学)
 Shenzhen Nanshan Yueliangwan Primary School (深圳市南山区月亮湾小学)
 Shenzhen Nanshan Zhuoya Primary School (深圳市南山区卓雅小学)
 Shenzhen Nanshan Yangguang Primary School (深圳市南山区阳光小学)
 Southern University of Science and Technology (SUSTech) Experimental Group
 (Nanshan) No.1 Primary School (实验一小)
 (Nanshan) No.2 Primary School (第二实验学校)
 Tanglang Primary School (塘朗小学/塘朗小學)
 Shenzhen University Affiliated Experimental Primary School (深圳大学附属教育集团实验小学)
 Xiangshanli Primary School (深圳市南山区香山里小学)

International and private schools

There are four Anglophone international high schools and private high schools in Nanshan. Several of these high schools all offer British, University of Cambridge International A-Level or North American style curricula, with English as the main language of instruction. There are also Japanese and South Korean-style schools.

Schools for children of foreign workers include:
BASIS International School Shenzhen - Part of the Basis Educational Group
 The International School of Nanshan Shenzhen (K-12)
 KIS Korean International School of Shenzhen (K-12, has a Korean section and an English elementary section)
 QSI International School of Shekou (K-12)
 Shekou International School (K-12)
 Shenzhen American International School (PK-8)
 Shenzhen Japanese School (grades 1-8)

Other schools with foreign educational systems:
 Shenzhen Nanshan Chinese International College (formerly Nanshan Bilingual School/Baishizhou Bilingual School)
Shen Wai International School - International division of Shenzhen Foreign Languages School, caters to children with foreign, Republic of China on Taiwan, and Hong Kong and Macau passports

Other private schools:
Shenzhen Dalton Xinhua School - K-12

Notes

References

Nanshan
Nanshan District, Shenzhen